The flathead worm snake (Antillotyphlops platycephalus) is a species of snake in the Typhlopidae family.

References

Antillotyphlops
Reptiles described in 1844
Taxa named by André Marie Constant Duméril
Taxa named by Gabriel Bibron